Paola Vanessa Herrera Núñez (born 10 March 1987), known as Vanessa Herrera, is an Ecuadorian former footballer who played as a defender. She has been a member of the Ecuador women's national team.

International career
Herrera capped for Ecuador at senior level during the 2010 South American Women's Football Championship.

References

External links

1987 births
Living people
Footballers from Quito
Women's association football defenders
Ecuadorian women's footballers
Ecuador women's international footballers
21st-century Ecuadorian women